White River Township is one of ten townships in Gibson County, Indiana. As of the 2010 census, its population was 1,689 and it contained 817 housing units.

It took its name from the White River.

Geography

Cities and towns
 Hazleton
 Patoka

Unincorporated towns
 East Mount Carmel
 White River
(This list is based on USGS data and may include former settlements.)

Adjacent townships
Gibson County
 Washington Township (east)
 Patoka Township (south)
 Montgomery Township (southwest)
Knox County
 Decker Township (northwest)
 Johnson Township (northeast)
Wabash County, IL
 Mt. Carmel Precinct (west)

Cemeteries
The township contains eight cemeteries: Barnett, Decker Chapel, Field, Humphrey, Milburn, Morrison, Robb and Trippet.

Major highways
 U.S. Route 41
 State Road 56
 State Road 64

Airports and landing strips
 Hull Airport

Education
White River Township is served by the North Gibson School Corporation and like neighboring Washington Township also has no schools of its own since the early 1970s.

References

External links
 Indiana Township Association
 United Township Association of Indiana
 U.S. Board on Geographic Names (GNIS)
 United States Census Bureau cartographic boundary files

Townships in Gibson County, Indiana
Townships in Indiana